SS Fiscus was a UK cargo steamship that was built in 1928, served in the Second World War and was sunk by a U-boat in 1940.

Building
Northumberland Shipbuilding Co (1927) Ltd of Howdon-on-Tyne built Fiscus, completing her in April 1928. The boilers fed a three-cylinder triple expansion steam engine that was rated at 432 NHP and drove a single screw. The engine was built by the North Eastern Marine Engineering Co, Ltd of Newcastle upon Tyne.

Fiscus was registered in Cardiff, managed by W.H. Seager & Co Ltd and owned by another of William Seager's companies, Tempus Shipping Co, Ltd.

Wartime career
Fiscus was sailing in convoys by May 1940, when she sailed in Convoy OB 152 from Port of Liverpool as far as Canada and then continued unescorted to Charleston, South Carolina. In July 1940 she brought a cargo of scrap iron across the North Atlantic to the UK via Bermuda, where she joined Convoy BHX 55 and Halifax, Nova Scotia, where BHX 55 joined Convoy HX 55. In September Fiscus again crossed to North America, this time in Convoy OB 208 from Liverpool to Canada.

Convoy SC 7 and sinking
Early in October 1940 Fiscus left Trois-Rivières, Quebec, carrying a cargo of steel, timber and a deck cargo of crated aircraft bound for the River Clyde in Scotland. Her Master was Ebenezer Williams. She went via Sydney, Nova Scotia, where she joined Convoy SC 7 which was bound for Liverpool. SC 7 left Sydney on 5 October. At first the convoy had only one escort ship, the  sloop . A wolf pack of U-boats found the convoy on 16 October and quickly overwhelmed it, sinking many ships over the next few days.

At 2355 hours on 18 October SC 7 was east of Rockall in the Western Approaches when the  commanded by Kapitänleutnant Otto Kretschmer torpedoed Fiscus. The steamship sank almost immediately, killing Captain Williams, 36 crew members and one DEMS gunner were lost. One man survived. A lifeboat from the Norwegian cargo steamship , which had been sunk earlier by U-99, sighted him standing on some débris and took him aboard. The   rescued him and Snefjelds survivors on 23 October.

Fiscus fatalities included two of the youngest killed in UK Merchant Navy service in the Second World War. Brothers Kenneth and Raymond Lewis from Wales were 14 and 15 years old respectively. They had joined Fiscus crew a few months earlier using a forged letter purporting to be from their father giving them permission to go to sea.

References

1928 ships
Maritime incidents in October 1940
Ships sunk by German submarines in World War II
Steamships of the United Kingdom
Ships built on the River Tyne
World War II merchant ships of the United Kingdom
World War II shipwrecks in the Atlantic Ocean